On the Trail is the sixth album by saxophonist Jimmy Heath featuring performances recorded in 1964 originally released on the Riverside label.

Reception

Scott Yanow of Allmusic says, "Heath is in excellent form with a quintet... It's a good example of his playing talents".

Track listing
All compositions by Jimmy Heath except as indicated
 "On the Trail" (Ferde Grofé) - 5:04   
 "Cloak and Dagger" - 4:17   
 "Vanity" (Guy Wood, Jack Manus, Bernard Bierman) - 4:37   
 "All the Things You Are" (Jerome Kern, Oscar Hammerstein II) - 5:19   
 "Gingerbread Boy" - 5:29   
 "I Should Care" (Axel Stordahl, Paul Weston, Sammy Cahn) - 5:13   
 "Project S" - 8:01

Personnel
Jimmy Heath - tenor saxophone
Kenny Burrell - guitar
Wynton Kelly - piano
Paul Chambers - bass
Albert Heath - drums

References

Riverside Records albums
Jimmy Heath albums
1964 albums